Twe (Ꚍ ꚍ; italics: Ꚍ ꚍ) is a letter of the Cyrillic script. Its glyph is derived from a lowercase Greek Tau.

Twe was used in old Abkhaz and in old Ossetian.

Usage
In Abkhaz, it represents the labialized voiceless alveolar plosive . It corresponds to the digraph Тә.

Computing codes

See also 
Т т : Cyrillic letter Te
Ʈ ʈ : Latin letter T with retroflex hook
Cyrillic characters in Unicode

References

Cyrillic letters